The Syrian Arab Football Association (SFA) is the governing body of football in Syria, controlling the Syrian national team and the Syrian Premier League. The Syrian Football Association was founded in 1936 and has been a member of FIFA since 1937, the Asian Football Confederation since 1970, and the Sub-confederation regional body West Asian Football Federation since 2001. Syria is also part of the Union of Arab Football Associations and has been a member since 1974. Syria's team is commonly known as Nosour Qasioun.

Affiliation
 FIFA (1937)
 AFC (1970)
 Union of Arab Football Associations (1974)
 WAFF (2001)

Association staff

List of presidents 
The following is a list of latest presidents of the Syrian Arab Federation for Football.

Management

League system

Tier 1: Syrian Premier League 
Tier 2: Syrian League 1st Division
Tier 3: Syrian League 2nd Division
Tier 4: Syrian League 3rd Division

Domestic cup
Syrian Cup 
Syrian Super Cup

National teams
Syria universal, under-23, under-20, under-17, women's and women's under-20 national association football teams
Syria national futsal team
Syria national beach soccer team

See also 
 Syria national football team
 Syria national under-23 football team
 Syria national under-20 football team
 Syria national under-17 football team
 Syria national futsal team
 Syria women's national football team
 List of football stadiums in Syria
 Football in Syria
 Sport in Syria

References

External links 
 Official website .
 @syrianfa on Facebook.
 Syrian-Soccer info portal on Syrian football.
 Syria at the FIFA website.
 Syria at AFC site.

Football in Syria
Football
Sports organizations established in 1936
Syria
1936 establishments in Mandatory Syria